Parliamentary elections were held in Latvia on 6 October 2018. Following the elections, a coalition government was formed by Who owns the state?, the New Conservative Party, Development/For!, the National Alliance and New Unity. Despite being from the smallest elected party, Arturs Krišjānis Kariņš of New Unity was chosen as Prime Minister.

Background
The 2014 elections saw Social Democratic Party "Harmony" emerge as the largest party. Although the largest party, Harmony has not participated in the government. A coalition was formed by Unity, the Union of Greens and Farmers and the National Alliance with Laimdota Straujuma as Prime Minister. On 7 December 2015 she resigned after increasing tensions within the ruling coalition. Following her resignation and several scandals around the Unity leader Solvita Āboltiņa, opinion polls showed a rapid decrease of support for Unity. On 13 January 2016 Māris Kučinskis of the Union of Greens and Farmers was nominated to be the next Prime Minister by President Raimonds Vējonis. His government was approved by the Saeima on 11 February.

Electoral system
The 100 members of the Saeima are elected by open list proportional representation from five multi-member constituencies (Kurzeme, Latgale, Riga (in which overseas votes are counted), Vidzeme and Zemgale) between 13 and 32 seats in size. Seats are allocated using the Sainte-Laguë method with a national electoral threshold of 5%.

Electoral alliances
The Movement For!, Latvian Development and Growth parties contested the election as the Development/For! alliance, formed on 20 April 2018.

The Social Democratic Workers' Party, the Christian Democratic Union and  contested the election as the SKG Alliance electoral list, the memorandum of which was signed by the leaders of the parties on 28 March 2018.

The long-standing alliance of the Latvian Farmers' Union and the Green Party (in cooperation with the regional For Latvia and Ventspils and Liepāja Party) continued.

Unity formed an association in April 2018 with several regional parties under the New Unity alliance. The involved parties are the Kuldīga County Party, For Valmiera and Vidzeme and  parties, joined by the Jēkabpils Regional Party. The Latgale Party, after a period of consideration, joined the alliance in July, although its Daugavpils chapter allied itself with The Progressives. The Progressives and Movement For! declined invitations to join the list.

Disqualifications
The Central Election Commission of Latvia used its powers to remove eight candidates from submitted lists. It did so after receiving notification from the Interior Ministry that the individuals in question were disqualified from election to the Saeima under the country's election law. The eight candidates were Aivars Zablockis and Nikolajs Žeļezņakovs (Eurosceptic Action Party), Zigfrīds Laicāns and Valdis Taupmanis (For Alternative), Edgars Krūmiņš (Latvian Association of Regions), Katrīna Brandala (The Progressives), Aivars Silinieks (Latvian Centrist Party) and Tatjana Ždanoka (Latvian Russian Union). Ždanoka has been barred in the past as Latvian courts have found that she was a member of the Communist Party of Latvia after 31 January 1991, making her ineligible. The Election Commission additionally sought information from the Security Police and the Constitution Protection Bureau to confirm her ineligibility.

Prime Minister candidates

Leading candidate by constituency

Other parties

 United for Latvia – on 17 May 2018 party leader Inese Muhamberga announced that the party will not run in the elections.
 Latvian Socialist Party – has not submitted a separate electoral list, instead urging "Latvian workers" to "vote politically bankrupt politicians out of office". Its alliance with Harmony was dissolved in 2014, although some of its members or supporters have continued to run as candidates from Harmony.

Opinion polls

Graphical summary

Results

Aftermath
Political leaders met on 18 October with the president Raimonds Vējonis. Although they failed to agree on a name for a Prime Minister, they reiterated their intention to form a coalition government and to exclude Harmony from any coalition, even if it required forming a coalition of five or six parties.

On 7 November 2018, Latvian President Raimonds Vējonis asked Bordāns to form a new coalition government and serve as the next Prime Minister of Latvia. Bordāns intended to form a five-party majority coalition, and he announced that his coalition will not include ZZS, a political alliance led by a Latvian oligarch Aivars Lembergs. However, other political parties wished to cooperate also with ZZS. Consequently, Bordāns did not reach an agreement with the coalition partners, and informed the President that he is unable to form the cabinet.

On 14 November 2018, Development/For!, National Alliance and New Unity pulled out of coalition talks with the New Conservative Party and KPV LV, making a five-way centre-right coalition government infeasible.

After Jānis Bordāns was unsuccessful in negotiating a governing coalition, President Raimonds Vējonis nominated Gobzems as Prime Minister of Latvia on November 26, 2018 and gave him two weeks to form a government. A week later, he proposed a coalition that would consist of his Who Owns the State? party along with the New Conservative Party, the National Alliance, the Union of Greens and Farmers, and New Unity, despite the conservatives' objection to the Greens and Farmers' inclusion in government. Fellow Who Owns the State? party leader Artuss Kaimiņš also opposed the inclusion of the Greens and Farmers, leading to a breakdown in talks later in the week. Gobzems then retracted his proposal for the coalition and instead called for a non-partisan cabinet of unnamed "best of the best" industry professionals, a proposal that was nearly immediately rejected by the conservatives, the nationalists, and New Unity on the grounds that it could increase the influence of the Harmony party. Although he had initially called on the president to hold early elections if his proposal were to be rejected, Gobzems instead offered a new four-party coalition that would not include the Union of Greens and Farmers. The president revoked Gobzems' nomination on December 10, 2018.

In December it was announced that coalition talks would continue into January.

On 7 January 2019, Arturs Krišjānis Kariņš was tasked by Latvian President Raimonds Vējonis with forming the next government, following the failures of previous nominees Bordans and Gobzems in a contentious negotiation process. Kariņš took office as prime minister on 23 January 2019, leading a broad centre-right coalition of five conservative and liberal parties that includes KPV LV, New Conservative Party, Development/For!, National Alliance and New Unity.

References

Latvia
Parliamentary elections in Latvia
2018 in Latvia
Latvia